The State University Construction Fund is a New York State public-benefit corporation that addresses the construction and capital planning needs of the State University of New York and affiliated institutions.

The mission of the fund is to act as an agent of the university to provide funding for buildings and to help reduce the time between the determination of need and the availability of the completed buildings.

The fund is run by a three-person Board of Trustees. One trustee is selected from the members of the SUNY Board of Trustees, and the other two are nominated by the Governor and confirmed by the State Senate.

See also
 Dormitory Authority of the State of New York
 Empire State Development Corporation
 New York State Environmental Facilities Corporation

References

External links
official website

State University of New York
Public benefit corporations in New York (state)